Slovenská záručná a rozvojová banka (Slovak Guarantee and Development Bank) is a specialised banking institution in Slovakia founded by the central body of state administration – the Ministry of Finance of the Slovak Republic. The bank has become the first bank in Eastern Europe to focus on the support of small and medium-sized enterprises. It started its activities on September 1991. Currently, the bank has 9 regional branches.

Headquarters
 Štefánikova 27, 814 99 Bratislava, Slovakia

References

External links
 Slovak Guarantee and Development Bank official site
 The central bank of the Slovak Republic - List of Banks

Banks of Slovakia
Banks established in 1991
1991 establishments in Czechoslovakia